Misty is a live album by American saxophonist Dexter Gordon recorded at the Jazzhus Montmartre in Copenhagen, Denmark in 1965 by Danmarks Radio and released on the SteepleChase label in 2004.

Critical reception 

AllMusic critic Matt Collar stated "these recordings stand as previously unissued testaments to the muscular and tender mid-career brilliance of Gordon. ... While Misty may only contain four standards that taken together clock in at just over 45 minutes, the playing by all involved is stellar, immediate, and inspired".

Track listing 
 "Take the "A" Train" (Billy Strayhorn) – 14:42
 "Shiny Stockings" (Frank Foster) – 16:27
 "Misty" (Erroll Garner) – 15:06
 "Cheese Cake" (Dexter Gordon) – 1:15

Source:

Personnel 
Dexter Gordon – tenor saxophone
Kenny Drew – piano
Niels-Henning Ørsted Pedersen – bass
Alex Riel – drums

Source:

References 

SteepleChase Records live albums
Dexter Gordon live albums
2004 live albums
Albums recorded at Jazzhus Montmartre